Boana caipora is a frog in the family Hylidae.  It is endemic to  Brazil.  Scientists have seen it 700 to 800 meters above sea level in Atlantic forest.

Original description

References

Amphibians described in 2008
Boana
Amphibians of Brazil
Endemic fauna of Brazil